Nuclear migration protein nudC is a protein that in humans is encoded by the NUDC gene.

Interactions 

NUDC has been shown to interact with PLK1 and PAFAH1B1.

References

Further reading